Ivens is a Germanic surname. Notable people with the surname include:

 Dirk Ivens, Belgian musician
 Frances Ivens (1870–1944), English obstetrician and gynecologist
 Jonas Ivens (born 1984), Belgian footballer and manager
 Joris Ivens (1898–1989), Dutch filmmaker
 Martin Ivens (born 1958), English journalist 
 Roberto Ivens (1850–1898), Portuguese explorer and naval officer
 T C Ivens, (1921-1988) English reservoir fly angler and author
 Terri Ivens (born 1967), American actress and author
 William Ivens (1878–1957), English-Canadian leading figure in the Winnipeg General Strike

See also
Ivins (disambiguation)

English-language surnames
German-language surnames